The White Book (흰) is a 2016 novel by the Korean novelist Han Kang which was short-listed for the 2018 Man Booker International Prize. The English translation by Deborah Smith was first published by Portobello Books in 2017.

The setting is in post World War II Warsaw, Poland. The book has been described as "a fragmented autobiographical meditation on the death of the unnamed narrator’s baby sister, who died two hours after her birth.". The novel uses an unconventional narrative and short meditations on the color white to discuss grief, loss, and the fragile nature of the human spirit. Kang describes a total of 65 white objects in the book, including rice, sugar cubes, and breast milk.

Main White Objects List 

 Swaddling bands
 Newborn gown
 Salt
 Snow
 Ice 
 Moon
 Rice
 Waves
 Yulan
 White bird
 "Laughing whitely"
 Blank paper
 White dog
 White hair
 Shroud

Translation 

 Kang, Han. The White Book. Translated by Smith, Deborah. Portobello Books. ISBN 978-0-525-57306-7

References 

21st-century South Korean novels
2016 novels
Grief in fiction
Portobello Books books